The Exorcism of Emily Rose is a 2005 American supernatural horror legal drama film directed by Scott Derrickson and starring Laura Linney and Tom Wilkinson. The film is loosely based on the story of Anneliese Michel and follows a self-proclaimed agnostic (Linney) who acts as defense counsel representing a parish priest (Wilkinson), accused by the state of negligent homicide after he performed an exorcism.

Plot
Erin Bruner, an ambitious lawyer seeking to become a senior partner in her law firm, takes the case of Father Richard Moore, a Catholic diocesan priest charged with negligent homicide following an attempted exorcism of 19-year-old student Emily Rose. While the archdiocese wants Moore to plead guilty to minimize the crime's public attention, Moore instead pleads not guilty. During the trial, the statements of the witnesses are visualized via flashbacks. Prosecutor Ethan Thomas interrogates several doctors and neurologists to establish a medical cause for Emily's death, particularly epilepsy and schizophrenia. Emily had dropped out of her college studies after being consistently struck by delusions and muscle spasms at 3 a.m. She returned to her parents' home and was treated with epilepsy and psychosis medications. Moore was consulted when her condition failed to improve, and his assessment and observations led him to the conclusion that Emily was being possessed by a demon. With the consent of Emily's parents, Moore subjected Emily to an exorcism that ultimately failed. Moore surmised that Emily's medications were to blame for the unsuccessful expulsion, as they paralyzed Emily's brain activity and kept the demon out of reach.

Moore, wanting to tell Emily's story, gives his testimony when he is called to the witness stand. Bruner begins experiencing supernatural phenomena at home, waking up at 3 a.m. to the smell of burning material. Moore warns her she may be a target for the demons, revealing he too has experienced similar phenomena on the night he was preparing the exorcism. Bruner supports Moore by summoning anthropologist Sadira Adani to testify about the beliefs surrounding spiritual possession from various cultures, but Thomas dismisses her claims as nonsense. Graham Cartwright, a medical doctor who attended the exorcism, gives Bruner a cassette tape on which the exorcism was recorded, and Moore presents the recording as evidence. Cartwright's testimony to authenticate the exorcism and refute the prosecution's medical case is prevented when he is suddenly struck and killed by a car. A distraught Bruner retreats to her office, where her boss threatens her with termination if she allows Moore to testify again. Bruner visits Moore in his jail cell, where he convinces her to allow him to tell the rest of Emily's story despite her boss's threat.

The next day, Moore takes the witness stand again and reads a letter that Emily wrote before she died. On the morning after the exorcism, Emily was visited by the Virgin Mary in a field near her house and was permitted the choice of ascending to Heaven. However, Emily chose to endure her suffering and later received stigmata on her hands. Thomas does not interpret the markings as a divine sign, but rather as traces of self-inflicted injuries. The jury ultimately reaches a verdict of guilty but surprises the court by asking Judge Brewster to give a sentence of time served. Although momentarily shocked by the suggestion, Brewster ultimately accepts it, and Moore is free to go. Bruner is offered a partnership in her firm, but declines. Later, Moore and Bruner pay a visit to Emily's grave, and Moore states that the time will come wherein Emily will be declared a saint. The epilogue reveals that Moore never appealed his conviction.

Cast

 Laura Linney as Erin Christine Bruner
 Jennifer Carpenter as Emily Rose
 Tom Wilkinson as Father Richard Moore
 Campbell Scott as Ethan Thomas
 Colm Feore as Karl Gunderson
 Joshua Close as Jason
 Kenneth Welsh as Dr. Mueller 
 Duncan Fraser as Dr. Graham Cartwright
 J. R. Bourne as Ray
 Mary Beth Hurt as Judge Brewster
 Henry Czerny as Dr. Briggs
 Shohreh Aghdashloo as Dr. Sadira Adani

Production
The screenplay was written by director Scott Derrickson and Paul Harris Boardman; in honor of the contributions of Boardman and other collaborators on the film, Derrickson chose to forgo the traditional "film by" credit. According to Derrickson's DVD commentary, he chose Boardman as his co-writer because Derrickson sees himself as a believer and Boardman as a skeptic, and believed the pairing would provide the screenplay with two different perspectives, thus providing the film some ambiguity as to whether it supports a religious/supernatural interpretation of the events depicted, or a more secular/medical interpretation.

The character of Emily Rose was inspired by the story of Anneliese Michel. German director Hans-Christian Schmid made his own film of Michel's story, Requiem, around the same time in late 2006. Linney recommended Carpenter for this role after working with her in a play.

Adolescent Sara Niemietz was chosen as the vocalist for the soundtrack and score. Niemietz worked again with Christopher Young on The Uninvited (2009), and is now an independent artist and cast-member with Postmodern Jukebox.

Reception

Box office
The Exorcism of Emily Rose made $75.1 million domestically, and $144.2 million worldwide against a $19 million budget. According to Derrickson, the film was not as successful as he hoped.

Critical reception
On the review aggregator website Rotten Tomatoes, the film holds an approval rating of 44%, based on 157 reviews. The site's critical consensus reads "Loosely based on a true story, The Exorcism of Emily Rose mixes compelling courtroom drama with generally gore-free scares in a ho-hum take on demonic cinema." On Metacritic, it has an overall score of 46 out of 100, based on 32 reviews.

Roger Ebert of the Chicago Sun-Times gave the film a rating of three out of four stars, describing it as "intriguing and perplexing" and writing that "the screenplay is intelligent and open to occasional refreshing wit." Paul Arendt of BBC gave the film three out of five stars, referring to the "flashback story" as "high-octane schlock that occasionally works your nerves, thanks to a committed performance from Jennifer Carpenter". Olly Richards of Empire gave the film three out of five stars as well, writing that "Viewed as a horror movie, Emily Rose isn't much scarier than the average, but combined with intelligent and balanced courtroom drama it has more to offer than your usual big-lunged, big-breasted screamer."

Jerome Reuter of Scream magazine gave the film a rating of two out of five stars, writing that "The Exorcism of Emily Rose, while compelling at times, is nothing more than a blatant attempt to utilise a real human tragedy for an agenda." Ed Gonzalez of Slant Magazine gave the film one-and-a-half out of four stars, criticizing the "witless, didactic" screenplay and writing that "I've witnessed more complicated existential wrangling exchanged between two tokers."

In 2006, the Chicago Film Critics Association listed the film in their Top 100 Scariest Films Ever Made at #86. Jennifer Carpenter, whose "demonic" bodily contortions were often achieved without the aid of visual effects, won "Best Frightened Performance" at the MTV Movie Awards in 2006.

Emily Rose is the Patron Saint of Enterprise, Alabama.

See also
 Anneliese: The Exorcist Tapes
 Exorcism: The Possession of Gail Bowers
 Possessed
 Exorcism of Roland Doe

References

External links

 
 
 
 
 Comparison of the true story and the film at Chasing the Frog

2005 films
2005 horror films
2000s crime drama films
2000s crime thriller films
2000s horror thriller films
Supernatural drama films
2000s legal films
2000s thriller drama films
American crime drama films
American crime thriller films
American horror thriller films
American legal drama films
American supernatural horror films
Demons in film
The Devil in film
American courtroom films
Films about exorcism
Films about lawyers
Films about Catholicism
Horror films based on actual events
Films directed by Scott Derrickson
Films produced by Beau Flynn
Films produced by Gary Lucchesi
Films produced by Tom Rosenberg
Films scored by Christopher Young
Films shot in Vancouver
American horror drama films
Lakeshore Entertainment films
Crime horror films
Legal horror films
Religious horror films
Screen Gems films
Films about spirit possession
2005 drama films
2000s English-language films
2000s American films